Epilobocera haytensis, also known in Dominican Spanish as jaiba de río (borrowed from Taíno), is a freshwater crab endemic to the Caribbean island of Hispaniola (split between the Dominican Republic and Haiti). It is found in nearly all of Hispaniola's lowland rivers, and is often harvested for food in both countries of the island.

References

sinuatifrons
Freshwater crustaceans of North America
Endemic fauna of Hispaniola
Arthropods of the Dominican Republic
Fauna of Haiti
Crustaceans described in 1893
Taxa named by Mary J. Rathbun